The following are lists of the highest-grossing domestic and international films in Indonesia with gross revenue in Indonesian Rupiah and the number of tickets sold nationwide.

Domestic films by admissions
This list is sorted by the number of tickets sold nationwide, as of March 2023, according to the filmindonesia.or.id.
However, the information on filmindonesia.or.id was accrued only from 2007, making some films that was released before 2007 are not included or do not have an accurate number of admissions. Number of admissions for films that was released before 2007 was collected from trusted articles or publications.

Films with the highest admissions in opening days 
The film Dilan 1991 broke the record by getting more than 800,000 tickets on the first day of screening.

Highest-grossing international films in Indonesia
The statistic on international films' Box office in Indonesia, Box Office Mojo
is the only website that provides the box office numbers for international films released in Indonesia.

Timeline of admissions and gross records

Local films by admissions

Foreign films by gross (not adjusted by inflation)

Notes

References

Indonesia
Cinema of Indonesia
Indonesian film-related lists